Zapatos Viejos is a Spanish-language 1993 film directed by .

References

External links

1993 films
Mexican musical comedy-drama films
1990s Spanish-language films
1990s Mexican films